Jim Dunn (born 1942) is an American politician and a former member of the Washington House of Representatives.  He represented the  17th Legislative District from 1996-2003 and 2006-2009. He is a member of the Republican Party.

Personal
Representative Jim Dunn and his wife, Joan, have been married since 1964 and have lived in Clark County since 1977. They have two grown children and five grandchildren.

A Vietnam era veteran, Representative Dunn served three enlistments in the U.S. Air Force and Reserves. He is also a descendant of pioneer families from the Washington and Alaska territories.

State government
Republican State Representative for the 17th Legislative District of Washington from 1996 through 2002; elected State Representative for that district again in 2004 and 2006, again as a Republican.  Dunn lost his primary bid for re-election in 2008.

Community activism
Knights of Columbus
County Charter Board
Holy Redeemer Catholic Church
Loyal Order of Moose
American Legion

References

External links
 

1942 births
Living people
Louisiana State University alumni
Republican Party members of the Washington House of Representatives
Native American state legislators in Washington (state)
Politicians from Anchorage, Alaska
Politicians from Vancouver, Washington
United States Air Force airmen
Military personnel from Anchorage, Alaska
United States Air Force reservists